The Expulsion from Paradise is a 1977 West German comedy-drama film directed by Niklaus Schilling. It was entered into the 27th Berlin International Film Festival.

Cast
 Herb Andress as Andy Paulisch
  as Astrid Paulisch
 Ksenija Protic as Countess
 Jochen Busse as Berens
 Andrea Rau as Evi Hollauer
 Herbert Fux as Cinematographer
 Elisabeth Bertram as Mother
 Georg Tryphon as Film Producer
 Trude Breitschopf as Kundin
 
 Werner Abrolat as Film Director
 Dieter Brammer as Besetzungschef
 Hans-Jürgen Leuthen
 Gert Wiedenhofen as Pfarrer
 Heinz Baues von der Forst as Grenzbeamter

References

External links

1977 films
1977 comedy films
1977 drama films
1977 comedy-drama films
German comedy-drama films
West German films
1970s German-language films
Films directed by Niklaus Schilling
Films about actors
Films set in Munich
Films set in Rome
1970s German films